In mathematics, the Jack function  is a generalization of the Jack polynomial, introduced by Henry Jack. The Jack polynomial is a homogeneous, symmetric polynomial which generalizes the Schur and zonal polynomials, and is in turn generalized by the Heckman–Opdam polynomials and Macdonald polynomials.

Definition
The Jack function  
of an integer partition , parameter , and arguments  can be recursively defined as 
follows:

 For m=1  

 

 For m>1

 

where the summation is over all partitions  such that the skew partition  is a horizontal strip, namely
 ( must be zero or otherwise ) and 

where  equals  if  and  otherwise. The notation  means that the product is taken over all coordinates  of boxes in the Young diagram of the partition .

Combinatorial formula

In 1997, F. Knop and S. Sahi  gave a purely combinatorial formula for the Jack polynomials  in n variables:

The sum is taken over all admissible tableaux of shape  and 

with 

An admissible tableau of shape  is a filling of the Young diagram  with numbers 1,2,…,n such that for any box (i,j) in the tableau,
  whenever 
  whenever  and 

A box  is critical for the tableau T if  and 

This result can be seen as a special case of the more general combinatorial formula for Macdonald polynomials.

C normalization

The Jack functions form an orthogonal basis in a space of symmetric polynomials, with inner product:

This orthogonality property is unaffected by normalization. The normalization defined above is typically referred to as the J normalization. The C normalization is defined as

where

P normalization

The P normalization is given by the identity , where 

where  and  denotes the arm and leg length respectively.

Similar to Schur polynomials,  can be expressed as a sum over Young tableaux. However, one need to add an extra weight to each tableau that depends on the parameter .

Thus, a formula  for the Jack function  is given by

where the sum is taken over all tableaux of shape , and  denotes the entry in box s of T.

The weight  can be defined in the following fashion: Each tableau T of shape  can be interpreted as a sequence of partitions 

where  defines the skew shape with content i in T. Then 

where 

Connection with the Schur polynomial

When  the Jack function is a scalar multiple of the Schur polynomial

where

Properties

If the partition has more parts than the number of variables, then the Jack function is 0:

Matrix argument
In some texts, especially in random matrix theory, authors have found it more convenient to use a matrix argument in the Jack function. The connection is simple. If  is a matrix with eigenvalues
, then

References

.
.

.

External links
 Software for computing the Jack function by Plamen Koev and Alan Edelman.
 MOPS: Multivariate Orthogonal Polynomials (symbolically) (Maple Package) 
 SAGE documentation for Jack Symmetric Functions
Orthogonal polynomials
Special functions
Symmetric functions